Landed nobility or landed aristocracy is a category of nobility in the history of various countries, for which landownership was part of their noble privileges. Their character depends on the country.

The notion of landed gentry in the United Kingdom and Ireland varied over time.
In Russian Empire landed nobles were called pomeshchiks, with the term  literally translated as "landed estate owner". See Russian nobility for more.
Junkers  were the landed nobility of Prussia and Eastern Germany.
Landadel were the landed nobility of the Holy Roman Empire.
In Poland, szlachta were usually landowners, with magnates being the class of the wealthiest szlachta. Middle and smaller landed szlachta was called ziemiaństwo/ziemianie (from the word ziemia, land), usually translated as landed gentry.
In some places, e.g., in Low Countries before Spanish rule, urban nobility with landed estates was distinct from landed nobility. In general, relations between landed nobility and towns was very complex in Europe.

In India, sardars, jagirdars, zamindars, mankaris were the landed aristocracies, which formed Indian feudalism. Sometimes, they were elevated to the status of 'princes' or 'royalty' owning princely states. Sometimes royal status was also reduced to the status of zamindars. Nambudiris and Nairs constituted the landed gentry and owned vast amounts of land spread out in current day Kerala and parts of Southern Tamil Nadu.
In the Philippines, the Principalía was the ruling and usually educated upper class in the towns of the Spanish Philippines. The distinction or status of being part of the principalía was a hereditary right. This upper class was exempted from tribute (tax) to the Spanish crown during the colonial period. The principales (members of the principalía) traced their origin from the pre‑colonial royal and noble class of Datu and Lakan of the established kingdoms, rajahnates, confederacies, and principalities, as well as the lordships of the smaller ancient social units called barangays in Visayas, Luzon, and Mindanao. The members of this class enjoyed exclusive privileges, including the right to vote, be elected to public office, and be addressed by the title: Don or Doña.
Within certain communities in Nigeria, the reigning monarchs (known as the traditional rulers) are often vested with inalienable landownership due to their positions, with them either owning tracts of land outright or holding them in trust for their states. Some communities don't follow this pattern, however. In the Kingdom of Lagos, for example, landownership is not traditionally vested in the Oba of Lagos, who is descended from later immigrants from the Kingdom of Benin, but is instead vested in the so-called Idejo class of titled aristocrats, who all claim descent from the earliest Yoruba settlers of Lagos.
In California, according to 1978 California Proposition 13, the tax basis on real estate is much lower for older property owners than for newcomers. Further, according to 1986 California Proposition 58 and 1996 California Proposition 193, the low tax basis is inherited by the children and grandchildren of property owners. NIMBY policies and rapidly increasing property values have led to a large socioeconomic gap in both homeownership and property tax burden. This has led some to call California property owners the new landed nobility.

References

Landowners
Nobility
Feudalism
Oligarchy

es:Terrateniente
gd:Uachdaran
ka:მემამულეები
ja:地主
ru:Помещик
zh:土地主